Sloat is an unincorporated community in Plumas County, California. It lies at an elevation of 4131 feet (1259 m).

The place was named in 1910 to honor Commodore John D. Sloat. The Sloat post office opened in 1914.
Sloat, California also is related to Sloatsburg, New York.

References

Unincorporated communities in California
Unincorporated communities in Plumas County, California